The Ariel Performing Arts Center (HaMishkan LeOmanuyot HaBama Ariel) is an Israeli performing arts complex, established in 2010 in  Ariel on the West Bank. It opened on November 8, 2010 with an acclaimed performance of Piaf by the Beersheba Theater company.

The opening was mired by an intended boycott by sixty actors, writers, and directors, including Joshua Sobol, who refuse to perform in settlements because it would "strengthen the settlement enterprise". Prime Minister Benjamin Netanyahu and other right-wing commentators characterized this as a "boycott... against Israel's citizens". The boycott is being supported by other Israeli artists such as Amos Oz, David Grossman, and Dani Caravan,; 150 U.S. actors have supported them in an open letter. though none of them have actually been invited to perform.

References

Arts organizations established in 2010
Israeli culture
Performing arts centres
2010 establishments in the Palestinian territories